Mehran Sattar (born 2 April 1995 in Shiraz) is an Iranian jiujitsu athlete. He won the Silver medal at the 2014 Ju-Jitsu World Championships in Paris and the Bronze medal at the 2017 Ju-Jitsu Asian Championships in Hanoi, Vietnam. He won 3rd place at the 2021 Ju-Jitsu Asian Championships in the United Arab Emirates.

He is a Member of the Iran Jiujitsu National Team in the 2018 Asian Games

and in Jakarta at the 2014 Asian Beach Games, and in Phuket, Thailand at the 2016 Asian Beach Games in Danang, Vietnam.

References

External links 
 Mehran Sattar on Instagram

Living people
1995 births
Iranian jujutsuka
Sport in Shiraz
People from Shiraz
Sportspeople from Fars province
Ju-jitsu practitioners at the 2018 Asian Games